New Zealand competed at the 1999 World Championships in Athletics held in Seville, Spain. Their best performances were 5th (by Beatrice Faumuina in the women's discus) and 7th (by Craig Barrett in men's 50km race walk).

Entrants

Key
Q = Qualified for the next round by placing (track events) or automatic qualifying target (field events)
q = Qualified for the next round as a fastest loser (track events) or by position (field events)
AR = Area (Continental) Record
NR = National record
PB = Personal best
SB = Season best
Placing x(y): x = place in group/heat; y = place in final
- = Round not applicable for the event

References

Nations at the 1999 World Championships in Athletics
New Zealand at the World Championships in Athletics
World Championships in Athletics